State Road 245 (NM 245) is a  state highway in the US state of New Mexico. NM 245's western terminus is at NM 311 north of Cannon Air Force Base, and the eastern terminus is at NM 209 in Clovis. NM 245 is also known as Llano Estacado Boulevard.

Major intersections

See also

References

245
Transportation in Curry County, New Mexico